The Norwood Avenue Historic District is a residential historic district in Cranston and Providence, Rhode Island. It includes all of the properties along Norwood Avenue between Broad Street in Cranston and Green Boulevard (the eastern edge of Roger Williams Park) in Providence. It is lined with houses built mostly between 1890 and 1930 in the Queen Anne and Colonial Revival styles.

The district is listed on the National Register of Historic Places, starting in 2002.

See also
National Register of Historic Places listings in Providence, Rhode Island
National Register of Historic Places listings in Providence County, Rhode Island

References

Historic districts in Providence County, Rhode Island
Cranston, Rhode Island
Geography of Providence, Rhode Island
Historic districts on the National Register of Historic Places in Rhode Island
National Register of Historic Places in Providence County, Rhode Island
National Register of Historic Places in Providence, Rhode Island